Julussa is a river in Innlandet county, Norway. The river flows through the Julussdalen valley in the municipalities of Elverum and Åmot. From Bergesjøen, Julussa flows to the northwest for  until it flows into the river Renaelva.

History
The name Julussa comes from the old Norwegian word "ljudlausa" which means soundless. The reason for that given name is that the river flows so silently through the valley of Julussdalen. 

Julussa was very important for timber rafting the timber out of the big forests, from around the mid 16th century until 1969. The place Brattveltdammen along the Julussa is known as a national historic place for the Julussa Conflict in 1927.

See also
List of rivers in Norway

References

Åmot
Elverum
Rivers of Innlandet